Thirakkil Alppa Samayam is a 1984 Indian Malayalam-language film, directed by P. G. Vishwambharan. The film stars Madhu, Thilakan, Shankar and Menaka. The film has musical score by Shyam.

Cast
Madhu as Khadar 
Mammootty as Antony 
Shankar as Rahim 
Balan K. Nair
Thilakan as Shankaran Nair 
Bheeman Raghu
T. G. Ravi
Ramu (actor)
G. K. Pillai
Mala Aravindan as Paramu 
Menaka
Seema as Sarala 
Rohini
Shubha

Soundtrack
The music was composed by Shyam and the lyrics were written by Chunakkara Ramankutty.

Box office
The film was a commercial success.

References

External links
 

1984 films
1980s Malayalam-language films
Films directed by P. G. Viswambharan